Mount Baldy is a  hill located within the Baskett Slough National Wildlife Refuge in Polk County, Oregon. A short trail loop operated by the wildlife refuge leads to an observation deck on the summit.

See also
 Eola Hills

References

Mountains of Oregon
Landforms of Polk County, Oregon